was a town located in Atetsu District, Okayama Prefecture, Japan.

As of 2003, the town had an estimated population of 3,961 and a density of 36.89 persons per km2. The total area was 107.37 km2.

On March 31, 2005, Tetta, along with the towns of Ōsa, Shingō and Tessei (all from Atetsu District), was merged into the expanded city of Niimi.

Dissolved municipalities of Okayama Prefecture